The Prince of Tmutarakan was the kniaz, the ruler or sub-ruler, of the Rus' Tmutarakan.

List of princes of Tmutarakan
 Mstislav of Chernigov, 988-1036
 Sviatoslav II of Kiev
 Rostislav of Tmutarakan
 Gleb Svyatoslavich
 Volodar of Peremyshl
 Oleg I of Chernigov, 1083-1094
Tmutarakan